Cladochaeta may refer to:

Cladochaeta (plant), a genus of the family Asteraceae
Cladochaeta (fly), a genus of the family Drosophilidae